Nargestan (also Romanized as Nargestān; also known as Nadgiran and Nargistān) is a village in Hend Khaleh Rural District, Tulem District, Sowme'eh Sara County, Gilan Province, Iran. At the 2006 census, its population was 1,027, in 310 families.

References 

Populated places in Sowme'eh Sara County